NGC 659 is an open cluster in the Cassiopeia constellation. It was discovered by Caroline Herschel in 1783.

References

External links
 
 
 SEDS – NGC 659

Open clusters
Cassiopeia (constellation)
0659
Astronomical objects discovered in 1783
Discoveries by Caroline Herschel